Asterocarpa is a genus of ascidian tunicates in the family Styelidae.

Species within the genus Asterocarpa include:
 Asterocarpa coerulea (Quoy & Gaimard, 1834) 
 Asterocarpa humilis (Heller, 1878)

Species names currently considered to be synonyms:
 Asterocarpa cerea (Sluiter, 1900): synonym of Asterocarpa humilis (Heller, 1878)

References

Stolidobranchia
Tunicate genera